

1971

See also 
 1971 in Australia

References

External links 
 Australian film at the Internet Movie Database

1971
Australian
Films